Ivis Martínez (born 5 January 1971) is a Salvadoran racewalker. She competed in the women's 20 kilometres walk at the 2000 Summer Olympics.

References

External links
 

1971 births
Living people
Athletes (track and field) at the 2000 Summer Olympics
Salvadoran female racewalkers
Olympic athletes of El Salvador
Athletes (track and field) at the 1999 Pan American Games
Pan American Games competitors for El Salvador
Competitors at the 2002 Central American and Caribbean Games
Place of birth missing (living people)
Central American Games gold medalists for El Salvador
Central American Games medalists in athletics
21st-century Salvadoran women